The Eastside Union School District is a school district that serves the eastern part of the city of Lancaster, California (USA).

The Eastside Union School District has approximately 3,500 students enrolled in four elementary schools and one junior high school.

The Eastside Union School District is only serving Transitional Kindergarten through the 8th grade. All public high school level education (9th12th grades) in the metropolitan area is provided by the Antelope Valley Union High School District.

List of schools

Elementary schools
Columbia Elementary School
Eastside Elementary School
Tierra Bonita Elementary School
Enterprise Elementary School

Junior high schools
Gifford C. Cole Middle School

See also
List of school districts in California
Lancaster School District
Westside Union School District

References

External links
 

 

Education in Lancaster, California
School districts in Los Angeles County, California